Gilgit-Baltistan Medico's Union (GBMU) is a representative organization of doctors studying in medical colleges in Azad Kashmir from Gilgit-Baltistan. It was established on 23 April 2019 in Rawalakot, Azad Kashmir. The main objectives of this organization are to create harmony and consensus among medical students from Gilgit-Baltistan studying in Azad Kashmir and to protect their interests.

Constitution approval 
The constitution of the organization was finally approved at a meeting held in Rawalakot city on 22 September 22, 2020.

Related Articles
Poonch Medical College
Gilgit Baltistan
Azad Kashmir
Azad Jammu Kashmir Medical College

References

Students' unions